The Kensington community centered at E 115th St. was historically Italian. Today, the community is composed mostly of Hispanics from Mexico where you can find churches, food, and corner stores in the tightly knit residential community.

See also
 West Pullman, Chicago
 Kensington/115th Street station
 Pullman, Chicago
 Roseland, Chicago

References

Neighborhoods in Chicago